Antaeotricha adjunctella is a moth in the family Depressariidae. It was described by Francis Walker in 1864. It is found in Amazonas in Brazil and in the Guianas.

Adults are pale cinereous (ash-gray) straw colour, the forewings with a fawn-coloured basal patch, which is accompanied by black streaks. There is a black point in the disk beyond the middle and the exterior space is fawn coloured, whitish streaked and traversed by an outward-curved whitish line. The marginal points are black and whitish bordered. The hindwings are whitish, with the exterior part tinged with pale fawn colour.

References

Moths described in 1864
adjunctella
Moths of South America